Monster is an album by American jazz organist Jimmy Smith arranged by Oliver Nelson.

On the Billboard albums chart, Monster peaked at number 35, and at 5 on the top R&B albums chart.

Writer Gerald Majer critiqued Monster in his 2013 book of essays, The Velvet Lounge: On Late Chicago Jazz.

Reception

AllMusic awarded the album two stars and its review by Scott Yanow stated that:

Track listing
 "Goldfinger (Part 1)" (Anthony Newley, John Barry, Leslie Bricusse) – 2:45
 "Goldfinger (Part 2)" (Newley, Barry, Bricusse) – 2:45
 "St. James Infirmary Blues" (Joe Primose) – 6:00
 "Gloomy Sunday" (Rezső Seress, Sam M. Lewis) – 5:00
 "Theme From Bewitched" (Howard Greenfield, Jack Keller) – 3:04
 "Theme From The Munsters" (Jack Marshall) – 3:30
 "Theme From The Man with the Golden Arm" (Elmer Bernstein) – 4:30
 "The Creeper" (Oliver Nelson) – 5:30
 "Monlope" (Jimmy Smith) – 6:15

Personnel

Musicians
 Jimmy Smith – organ
 Oliver Nelson – arranger, conductor
 Richard Davis  – double bass
 Grady Tate – drums
 Kenny Burrell – guitar
 Warren Smith – percussion
 Robert Ashton – saxophone
 Budd Johnson, Jerome Richardson, Phil Woods, Danny Banks, Raymond Beckenstein, George Dorsey, Harvey Estrin – wind instruments

Technical
 Creed Taylor – producer
 Rudy Van Gelder – engineer
 Val Valentin – director of engineering
 John Henry, Chuck Stewart – photography
 Johnny Magnus – liner notes

Chart performance

Album

References

1965 albums
Jimmy Smith (musician) albums
Albums arranged by Oliver Nelson
Albums produced by Creed Taylor
Albums recorded at Van Gelder Studio
Verve Records albums